WHDG (97.3 FM) is a radio station broadcasting a country music format. Licensed to Rhinelander, Wisconsin, United States, the station is currently owned by NRG Media through licensee Raven License Sub, LLC and features programming from Fox News Radio and Jones Radio Network.

Current on-air staff
 Michael "Double M" Michalak-Mornings
 Penny Mitchell-Middays
 Alan "Al" Higgins-Afternoons"
 Whitney Allen(Host of the nationally syndicated series simply entitled, "The Big Time With Whitney Allen" which airs every Monday to Saturday evenings) Happy T. Hodag-The mascot of WHDG since 1994'''

History
The station went on the air as WZTT on 1984-04-17.  On 1994-07-08, the station changed its call sign to the current WHDG.

On July 19, 2009, the station moved from their longtime frequency of 97.5 to 97.3 to accommodate the frequency of Glenmore-licensed station WTAQ-FM on 97.5, which serves the Green Bay market and signed on in February 2010.

References

External links

HDG
Country radio stations in the United States
Radio stations established in 1984
NRG Media radio stations